Piore Ridge is a prominent ridge, 11 nautical miles (20 km) long, located between Elder Glacier and Bowers Glacier in the Victory Mountains of Victoria Land. Mapped by the New Zealand Geological Survey Antarctic Expedition (NZGSAE), 1957–58, and the United States Geological Survey (USGS), 1960–62. Named by Advisory Committee on Antarctic Names (US-ACAN) for Emanuel Ruben Piore, American physicist, member of the National Science Board, National Science Foundation, 1961–72.

Ridges of Victoria Land
Borchgrevink Coast